Liga 1, also known as BRI Liga 1 for sponsorship reasons with Bank Rakyat Indonesia, is the men's top professional football division of the Indonesian football league system. Administered by the PT Liga Indonesia Baru, Liga 1 is contested by 18 clubs and operates on a system of promotion and relegation with Liga 2.

Top-flight professional league in Indonesia started from the 2008–09 season onwards, initially under the name of Indonesia Super League until 2015. Prior to the 2008 reforms, the national competitions used a tournament format. Liga 1 started in 2017 as the first rebranding of the league. Liga Indonesia, whose name was previously used from its formation in 1994 until 2015, will start in 2023 as the second rebranding of the league.

Forty teams have competed in the top-tier league of Indonesian football since the start of the modern era in 2008 as the Indonesia Super League. Seven teams have been crowned champions, with Persipura Jayapura winning the title three times (2009, 2011, 2013), the most among the teams.

History

Origins 
In 1994, PSSI merged teams from Perserikatan, which was a popular league for amateur clubs representing regional football associations, and Galatama, which was a less popular league made up of semi-professional teams, to form Liga Indonesia, integrating the fanaticism in the Perserikatan and the professionalism of Galatama with the aim of improving the quality of Indonesian football. This effort ushered in a tiered system in the Indonesian competitive football scene. The group stage format, which was used in Perserikatan, was combined with a full competition system followed by the semi-final and final rounds like Galatama.

Foundation 
The modern competition era started in 2008 with the 2008–09 Indonesia Super League. The first season began with 18 clubs. The first Indonesia Super League goal was scored by Ernest Jeremiah of Persipura in a 2–2 draw against Sriwijaya F.C. The 18 inaugural members of the new Indonesia Super League were Persipura, Persiwa, Persib, Persik, Sriwijaya, Persela, Persija, PSM, Pelita Jaya, Arema, Persijap, Persiba, PKT Bontang, Persitara, PSMS, Deltras, Persita, and PSIS. Originally, Persiter and Persmin were qualified to register but they failed the verification requirements to be inaugural members of the Indonesia Super League.

Dualism 

As the football scene in Indonesia was heavily politicized with rival factions upending each other, conflict was the norm prior to 2017. The worst conflict occurred in 2011. After the inauguration of the new PSSI board in 2011, a member of PSSI's Executive Committee and chairman of its Competition Committee, Sihar Sitorus, appointed PT Liga Prima Indonesia Sportindo as the new league operator replacing PT Liga Indonesia because the latter failed to provide an accountability report to the PSSI. Sitorus, one of many politicians in the PSSI, announced the Indonesia Premier League as the new top-level competition in Indonesia. Upon the emergence of Liga Primer Indonesia (LPI), PSSI did not recognize the validity of ISL. ISL regulars PSM, Persema, and Persibo, which had boycotted the ISL operators due to referee and management decisions, gladly defected to join LPI along with splinters of existing ISL teams. However, the 2011 LPI season was stopped mid-season, due to continued schism within PSSI; a new league, Indonesian Premier League (IPL) replaced it in late 2011 for the 2011–12 season.

Before the schism of PSSI, Sitorus triggered more controversy when he said the new competition would be divided into two regions and there would be an addition of six clubs in the top division, which angered many association members. Thus, 14 teams that were supposed to be Indonesia Premier League contestants chose to support the Indonesia Super League that continued to roll under the support of the pro-IPL faction, despite being labeled as an illegal competition. The official PSSI, supported by FIFA and AFC, did not recognize the ISL for two seasons. In the meantime, the Indonesian Premier League became the top-tier league from 2011 to 2013 with only 11 teams.

In a PSSI extraordinary meeting on 17 March 2013, association members slammed Sitorus and decided that the Indonesia Super League would once again emerge as the top-level competition, following the disbandment of the Indonesian Premier League. Sitorus and five other PSSI board members were suspended from the sport for their roles in the split (locally referred to as) that disrupted Indonesian football.

The new PSSI board also decided that the best seven teams of the 2013 Indonesian Premier League, following verification, would join the unified league. Semen Padang, Persiba Bantul, Persijap, and PSM passed verification, while Perseman, Persepar, and Pro Duta did not, meaning the 2014 season was contested with 22 teams.

Government intervention and FIFA suspension 

The impact of split haunted Indonesian football years after the reconsolidation. On 18 April 2015, Minister of Youth and Sports Affairs Imam Nahrawi officially banned the activities of PSSI after PSSI refused to recognize the recommendations from the Indonesian Professional Sports Agency (BOPI), an agency under the ministry, that Arema Cronus and Persebaya should not pass ISL verification because there were still other clubs using the same name. Previously, Nachrawi had sent three letters of reprimand. However, PSSI refused to answer his call until a predetermined deadline. As a result, PSSI officially stopped all competitions in 2015 season after PSSI's Executive Committee meeting on 2 May 2015 called the government intervention as a force majeure.

The government intervention also led FIFA to punish Indonesia with a one-year suspension of all association football activities as the world body considered overbearing state involvement in footballing matters as a violation against its member PSSI. During the suspension, some tournaments were made to fill the vacuum, starting with the 2015 Indonesia President's Cup, in which Persib came out as champions, until the Bhayangkara Cup closed the series of unrecognized tournaments.

On 13 May 2016, FIFA officially ended the suspension, following the revocation of the Indonesian ministerial decision on 10 May 2016. A long-term tournament with full competition format, Indonesia Soccer Championship, emerged shortly thereafter. The 2016 season saw Persipura taking the title.

First name change 
In 2017, the top-flight football competition was rebranded under a new official name, Liga 1. The name changes also applied to Premier Division (became Liga 2) and Liga Nusantara (became Liga 3). The operator of the competition was also changed from PT Liga Indonesia (LI) to PT Liga Indonesia Baru (LIB). Bhayangkara was the first champion of the competition under the new name. True to the controversial nature of Indonesian football, the crowning triggered flak from fans. Bhayangkara, a team managed by the Indonesian Police that had no fanbase, won due to head-to-head advantage against Bali United, a team with rapidly growing support due to its modern professional management, after both teams had the same points at the end of the season. Bali United finally won the title in 2019.

Second name change 
In 2023, PSSI in their workshop decided that, starting from the 2023–24 season, Liga 1 would change its name to Liga Indonesia. The name change would also apply to Liga 2 (to become Liga Nusantara).

Competition format

Competition 
There are 18 clubs in Liga 1. During the course of a season all teams play each other twice (a double round-robin system), once at their home stadium and once at that of their opponents', for 34 games. Teams receive three points for a win, one point for a draw, and no points for a loss. Teams are ranked by total points first, then head-to-head records, goal difference, goals scored, fair play, and drawing of lots. The three lowest placed teams are relegated into Liga 2, and the second round group winners from Liga 2, together with the winner of third place play-off involving the group runner-up of Liga 2 second round, are promoted in their place.

In 2023, PSSI proposed a new format starting from the 2023–24 season with two possible options: 18 teams being divided into three groups or playing in a full competition system with a final-four series. They chose the second option and all 18 clubs agreed.

Promotion and relegation 
A system of promotion and relegation exists between Liga 1 and Liga 2. The three lowest placed teams in Liga 1 are relegated to Liga 2, and the second round group winners from Liga 2 are promoted to the Liga 1, with an additional team promoted after a third-place play-off involving the group runners-up of Liga 2 second round. The Indonesian Super League had 22 teams in 2014 due to the merging of the two professional leagues in Indonesia.

Clubs 

Forty clubs have played in the top-flight Indonesian football competitions from the start of the modern era in 2008 as Indonesia Super League, up to and including the 2022–23 season.

Champions

Most successful clubs 

Notably three-time champions Persipura and one-time champions Sriwijaya are currently out of the Liga 1.

2022–23 season 
The following 18 clubs will compete in the Liga 1 during the 2022–23 season.

 Remark : Top division means the highest level of Indonesian football which includes the Liga Indonesia Premier Division until 2008 and the Indonesian Premier League during the dualism era.
 Top division began from 1994–95 season when Galatama and Perserikatan merged to form Liga Indonesia.
 Persipura, Persela, and Persiraja were relegated to the Liga 2 for the 2022 season, while Persis, RANS Nusantara, and Dewa United as winners, runners-up, and third-place play-off winners respectively, were promoted from the 2021 season.
a: Founding member of the Liga 1
b: Never been relegated from Liga 1
c: Absent but never got relegated

Maps

Former clubs 
The following clubs competed in the Liga 1 for at least one season, but are not competing in the 2022–23 season.

 Remark : Top division means the highest level of Indonesian football which includes the Liga Indonesia Premier Division until 2008 and the Indonesian Premier League during the dualism era.
a: Founding member of the Liga 1

All-time Liga 1 table 
The All-time Liga 1 table is an overall record of all match results, points, and goals of every team that has played in Liga 1 since its inception in 2008. The table is accurate as of the end of the 2021–22 season. Because the 2014 season used a two-region format, as per statistical convention in football, matches decided in extra time are counted as wins and losses, while matches decided by penalty shoot-outs are counted as draws. This all-time table also includes the abandoned 2015 and 2020 season.

Notes: 

Point deductions: 

League or status at 2022–23:

Players

Foreign players 
Foreign players policy has changed multiple times since the league inception.
 2008–2013: 5 foreign players including 2 Asian quota.
 2014: 4 foreign players including 1 Asian quota and only 3 can be on the field at a time.
 2015: 3 foreign players. All 3 players can be on the field.
 2017: 4 foreign players including 1 Asian quota and 1 marquee player quota. All 4 players can be on the field.
 2018–present: 4 foreign players including 1 Asian quota. All 4 players can be on the field.
 Scheduled for 2023: 6 foreign players including 1 ASEAN quota. Only 5 can be on the field at a time.

Awards

Top scorers 

Notes:

Best players

Best young players

Best goalkeepers

Best coaches

Best goals

Fair play teams

Best referees

Sponsorship

Media coverage

Current

Former 

Notes:

Commercial partners

See also 

 List of football clubs in Indonesia
 List of football clubs in Indonesia by major honours won
 List of top-division football clubs in AFC countries
 List of association football competitions
 Football records and statistics in Indonesia

References

External links 
  
 Indonesia – List of Champions at the RSSSF 

 
1
1
Top level football leagues in Asia
Sports leagues established in 2008
Sports leagues established in 2017
2008 establishments in Indonesia
2017 establishments in Indonesia
Professional sports leagues in Indonesia